Muhammad Abdul Salaam (1931 – 3 December 2016), also known as Syed Abdus Salam, was an Indian former footballer. He competed in the men's tournament at the 1956 Summer Olympics.

Honours

Player

Mohammedan Sporting
Calcutta Football League: 1957
IFA Shield: 1957

Manager

India U19
AFC Youth Championship: 1974

See also
 List of India national football team managers

References

External links
 
 

1931 births
2016 deaths
Indian footballers
India international footballers
Olympic footballers of India
Footballers at the 1956 Summer Olympics
Footballers from Hyderabad, India
Mohammedan SC (Kolkata) players
Association football midfielders
Indian football coaches
Indian football managers
India national football team managers
Calcutta Football League players
Footballers at the 1958 Asian Games
Asian Games competitors for India